documenta 6 was the sixth edition of documenta, a quinquennial contemporary art exhibition. It was held between 24 June and 2 October 1977 in Kassel, West Germany. The artistic director was Manfred Schneckenburger. The title of the exhibition was: Internationale Ausstellung – international exhibition.

Participants

References 

Documenta
1977 in Germany
1977 in art